Julien Serrano (born 13 February 1998) is a French professional footballer who plays as a left-back.

Career
On 20 July 2017, Serrano signed his first professional contract with Monaco, keeping him at the club until 2020. Serrano made his professional debut for Monaco in a 3–1 Ligue 1 loss to Guingamp on 21 April 2018.

On 21 August 2020, Serrano joined Scottish Premiership side Livingston on a season-long loan deal.

On 31 August 2021, Serrano was released by Monaco. In December 2021, he signed for Créteil.

References

External links
 
 AS Monaco Profile
 LFP Profile
 UEFA Youth Profile
 L'Equipe Profile

1998 births
Living people
Sportspeople from Aix-en-Provence
French footballers
French expatriate footballers
French people of Spanish descent
US Pontet Grand Avignon 84 players
AS Monaco FC players
Cercle Brugge K.S.V. players
AS Béziers (2007) players
Livingston F.C. players
US Créteil-Lusitanos players
Ligue 1 players
Belgian Pro League players
Championnat National players
Championnat National 3 players
Scottish Professional Football League players
Association football fullbacks
French expatriate sportspeople in Belgium
French expatriate sportspeople in Monaco
Expatriate footballers in Monaco
Expatriate footballers in Belgium
Expatriate footballers in Scotland
French expatriate sportspeople in Scotland
Footballers from Provence-Alpes-Côte d'Azur